Better than You may refer to:

 "Better than You" (Metallica song), 1998
 "Better than You" (Kate Alexa song), 2006
 "Better than You" (Conor Maynard song), 2012
 Better than You (mixtape), a 2022 mixtape by DaBaby and YoungBoy Never Broke Again
 "Better than You", a song by Swans from their album White Light from the Mouth of Infinity